Jairus Reuel Balagtas Aquino (born April 1, 1999) is a Filipino actor best known for his roles in Super Inggo, Kung Fu Kids and Luv U.

He appeared in several television advertisements before his first television appearance as an actor in ABS-CBN's television series Super Inggo. The series became popular, earning him the household name "Pareng Jomar", also known as "Pambansang Bestfriend ng Pilipinas" (National Best Friend of the Philippines). Since then, he is seen in ABS-CBN's television shows and films, as part of Star Magic.

Biography

Early life
Jairus Aquino was born in Caloocan, Philippines. His family is composed of two older siblings, a girl and a boy, father and mother named Carrie.<ref name=Kung_Fu2>[http://www.pinoyexchange.com/forums/showthread.php?t=323402&page=15 "Copy of Child star is action hero in 'Kung Fu Kids article"]. Pinoy Exchange. Retrieved 2014-05-30.</ref>

With encouragement from friends and family support, Aquino began his career as a commercial model at the age of 7. He appeared in several advertisements both for print, media and apparel before he stopped short after his parents became concerned of him being at work at an early age. One of his commercial appearances, for  "Dolfenal Mefenamic acid", tells about a father who has a headache and his tagline was "Sabi ni Daddy Mamaya nalang daw" (Daddy says later).

Career

Super Inggo series: 2006–2007
In 2006, Aquino auditioned on ABS-CBN's upcoming series Super Inggo after his family's friends introduced it.

The series is about a 17-year-old boy, played by Makisig Morales, who dreamed to become a superhero. Aquino was given the role of "Jose Mariano Jomar Sebastian", a young child who grew up as a street smart witty kid raised by his "Kuya Paloy", played by Alwyn Uytingco. The series became popular, earning him the household name "Pareng Jomar", also known as "Pambansang Bestfriend ng Pilipinas" (National Best Friend of the Philippines) as his character defines a loyal brother, a loving son, and a good friend. Since then, he is seen in ABS-CBN's television shows and films, as part of Star Magic. The series boosts his popularity, which paved way for more projects.

The popularity of his tandem with Makisig Morales in Super Inggo made him a co-host for ABS-CBN's Little Big Superstar as well as his inclusion in the release of Little Big Star'''s debut album, Little Big Superstar. It was then followed by another album release entitled Oldies but Kiddies under Star Records, after he joined the kiddie boy band group, "Mak and the Dudes".

Following the end of the first season of the Super Inggo series, Aquino was offered to join the cast of Rounin, an ABS-CBN Philippine drama dubbed as tele-epiko or TV epic. He played the young version of "Mythos" where he trained kick boxing for two weeks in preparation for his role. He was paired with Sharlene San Pedro who played as young Selene. Mythos and Selene were the young lovers of Lumeria, who were also the main protagonist of the show. This was their first team-up in a primetime series. In addition, he appeared as a young version of "Miguel" in ABS-CBN's adaptation of Lastikman. These two were his longest cameo primetime appearances during his early career.

During the same year, he did several roles, both for film and television, before reuniting with the cast of Super Inggos sequel Ang Bagong Bangis. He also did his first voice acting project for Super Inggo at ang Super Tropa, an animated version of the series where he voiced the character of "Jomar".

2008-2010:Kung Fu Kids and other projects
In 2008, Aquino was given the title role in Kung Fu Kids as "Lembot/Fish Boy" following the end of Super Inggo 1.5: Ang Bagong Bangis. Aquino auditioned for ABS-CBN's upcoming television series Kung Fu Kids. According to the director, Malou Sevilla, out of the many child stars who auditioned for "Lembot", the main character of the series, Aquino fits the role the most. Soon after, he learned a couple of martial arts sequences, particularly karate, in preparation for the series. His acting was complimented by his costars in the series, agreeing that he is the best actor among the four other male child stars.

It was also the same year where he made his first afternoon television drama series Pieta which starred Ryan Agoncillo, as well as his first comedy sitcom That's My Doc with Aga Muhlach, followed by M3 (Malay Mo Ma-develop) together with Ms. Ai Ai delas Alas in 2010.

Aquino appeared in several films playing cameo roles since his early career. His first appearance was in Star Cinema's romantic comedy film, D' Lucky Ones. He also appeared in several Metro Manila Film Festival entries such as Resiklo, Wapakman, Shake Rattle and Roll XI and Super Inday and the Golden Bibe. In addition, he had few short films including his first independent film Ang Asawa kong si Nikulet which gained a positive response, and Project Noel which was produced by Miss Earth Foundation.

His most notable film collaboration was when he voiced the character of "Bryan/Mang Ernie" in the 2010 Metro Manila Film Festival entry RPG: Metanoia. The film won 2010 Metro Manila Film Festival's 3rd Best Picture, Best Sound Recording and Best Original Theme Song, as well as being nominated in Asia Pacific Screen Awards.

2011-present: Teenage years and Luv U
After his two years of absence in the "Primetime", Aquino once again showed his acting prowess in the ABS-CBN adaptation of Mutya in 2011 where he played the role of "Aries". It was followed by ABS-CBN drama series Kahit Puso'y Masugatan in 2012 where he played the role of Young Balong. He also appeared in Star Cinema's Way Back Home topbilled by Kathryn Bernardo and Julia Montes.

2011 is the turning point of Aquino's life as he officially turns into a teenager. He currently stars as Frederick Drake Lagdameo in the second season of Luv U, opposite Shirley Bernardo portrayed by Sharlene San Pedro. After teaming-up in the series, Aquino and San Pedro are given another series entitled "Si Lulu at si Lili Liit" with Francis Magundayao. It is part of Wansapanataym series that will air one-month long starting March 1.

Personal life

Aquino enjoys his time with his family and friends. He spends most of his time playing basketball and online games. He also allotted time visiting his Facebook and Twitter account to reach out his fans. Jairus and his family are also active members of The Church of Jesus Christ of Latter-day saints.

At age 9, Aquino already saved money from his earnings in working in the entertainment industry. As a matter of fact, he had helped his parents to have their own car, Toyota LT, which he had earned from Lastikman. He states: "Whenever I had to go somewhere else, we had to borrow my father's car. Whereas right now, I already have my own car, though it is only second-hand.

When he was cast in Pieta in 2008, he learns how to cry on set after being taught by the directors Rhayan Carlos and Gilbert Perez and Malou de Guzman. He states: "It was difficult for me to cry before that they had to tell me things before I cry. However, I discovered that drama is just as difficult as comedy because it is difficult to make the Filipinos laugh.

Education
At 9, Aquino takes up a home study program at Angelicum College in order to balance his work and school. He is currently enrolled at Meridian International College.

Public image
In 2014, Aquino is voted second as the "Most Promising Young Male Star" by fans, behind Nash Aguas. On March 26, Star Cinema created a poll on its website for the most promising young male star. The response from his fans is huge, having a total of 37.57% votes. The production company lists the reasons of him becoming the most promising star, which includes his good acting skills and charm, has "star quality" (talented, skilled, and being loved by people), and remarkable.

In the same year, he, along with his current on-screen partner, Sharlene San Pedro, ranked fourth in another poll for the "Hottest Love Team" by the same website. Once again, fans voted for them, which garnered 14.03% of the total votes. Their loveteam, dubbed as "JaiLene", were just behind "Kath-Niel", "Vice-Rylle" and "Kim-Xi" loveteams.

Filmography
Films

Television
{| class="wikitable" style="width:80%"
! Year !! Title !! Character/Role
|-
| rowspan=2|2006 || Super Inggo || Jomar 
|-
|  Love Spell Presents: Pasko Na, Santa Ko || Boni
|-
| rowspan=5|2007 || Rounin || young Mythos
|-
| Ysabella || young Andrew / Albert Amarillo
|-
| Mars Ravelo's Lastikman || young Miguel / Eskappar
|-
| Super Inggo 1.5: Ang Bagong Bangis || Jomar
|-
| Goin' Bulilit || Himself
|-
| rowspan=6|2008 || Your Song Presents: Superstar Ng Buhay Ko || Macoy
|-
| Kung Fu Kids || Waldo "Lem" Ramos Jr. / Fei / Fish Boy
|-
| Your Song Presents: I'll Take Care Of You || Harvie
|-
| That's My Doc || Jai
|-
|  Maalaala Mo Kaya: Sanggol || Russel
|-
| Carlo J. Caparas' Pietà || Toto
|-
| rowspan=9|2009 ||  Maalaala Mo Kaya: Wheelchair || Mark
|- 
|  Maalaala Mo Kaya: Laruan || Marco
|-
| Everybody Hapi || Santiny
|-
| Komiks Presents: Nasaan Ka Maruja || young Gabriel
|-
| May Bukas Pa || young Enrique Gunsalvo
|-
| Nagsimula sa Puso || young Carlo
|-
| Lovers In Paris || young Martin
|-
| Precious Hearts Romances Presents: My Cheating Heart || young Harry
|-
| Super Inggo At Ang Super Tropa || Jomar (voice)
|-
| rowspan=12|2010 ||  Maalaala Mo Kaya: Kariton || Isko
|-
| Agimat: Ang Mga Alamat ni Ramon Revilla: Tonyong Bayawak || Student (Cameo role)
|-
| Goin' Bulilit || Nono Pinuno
|-
| Precious Hearts Romances Presents: You're Mine, Only Mine || Raymond
|-
|  Agimat: Ang Mga Alamat ni Ramon Revilla: Elias Paniki || young Elias
|-
| Precious Hearts Romances Presents: Impostor || young Anthony Florencio
|-
| M3 (Malay Mo Ma-develop) || Marcus
|-
| Noah || young Gabriel Perez
|-
| Imortal || young Mateo
|-
| Kokey @ Ako || young Roland Reyes
|-
| Wansapanataym: Valentina || young Robert
|-
|  Maalaala Mo Kaya: Plane Ticket || young Jerry
|-
| rowspan=8|2011 || Pablo S. Gomez's Mutya || Aries
|-
| Wansapanataym: Swap || Rayne
|-
|  Maalaala Mo Kaya: Tulay' || young Nikko Mataro
|-
| Guns and Roses || preteen Abel Marasigan
|-
| Wansapanataym: Mga Alipin Ng Lumang Aklatan || Miko
|-
|  Maalaala Mo Kaya: Itak || young Rene
|-
| Wansapanataym: My Gulay || Popoy
|-
| Real Confessions: Sulat Sa Langit || Ralph
|-
| rowspan=6|2012 ||  Maalaala Mo Kaya: School Uniform || Johnray
|-
|  Maalaala Mo Kaya: Bahay || Young Tikboy
|-
| Kahit Puso'y Masugatan || Preteen Balong 
|-
|Ina, Kapatid, Anak || young Oscar
|-
| Precious Hearts Romances Presents: Pintada || Bordy
|-
| Wansapanataym: Jingle's Bell || Robert
|-
| rowspan=3|2013 ||  Maalaala Mo Kaya: Football || Mige
|- 
| Wansapanataym: OMG (Oh My Genius!) || Harvey
|-
| Luv U || Frederick "Drake" Lagdameo
|-
| rowspan=3|2014 || Wansapanataym: Si Lulu At Si Lily Liit || Harvey
|-
|  Maalaala Mo Kaya: Longboard || Dandoy Tongco
|-
| Hawak-Kamay || teenage Gin Agustin
|-
| rowspan=4|2015 || Maalaala Mo Kaya: Hagdanan || Andre
|-
| Bridges of Love || teenage Gael Nakpil
|-
| Nathaniel || Joshua Casillas
|-
|  Maalaala Mo Kaya: Rubber Shoes ||
|-
| rowspan=4|2016 ||  Wansapanataym: Susi Ni Sisay || Marcus
|-
| FPJ's Ang Probinsyano || teenage Edwin Maniego
|-
|  Maalaala Mo Kaya: Salamin || Edwin
|-
| Langit Lupa || Lyndon "Batas/Junjun" Marasigan Jr.
|-
| rowspan=1|2017 || Ipaglaban Mo: Laro ||Axel
|-
| rowspan=2|2018 || Halik || Young Gab
|-
|Spirits: Reawaken || Jesse
|-
| rowspan=4|2019 ||  Wansapanataym: Mr. Cutepido || Michael
|-
| Ipaglaban Mo: Ingrata || Adel
|-
| Ipaglaban Mo: Utang || Arthur
|-
| Pamilya Ko || Percival "Persi" Mabunga
|-
| rowspan=2| 2021 || Encounter || Justin Hilario
|-
| Niña Niño || Richard
|-
| 2022 || Kalye Kweens || Dino Catapang (Telly's Son)
|}

Reality/Variety shows

Hosting
MYX VJ: 2016-2018
Aja Aja Tayo: 2018–2019 (Guest Host) twice a month

Discography

Videography

Music videos

Awards and nominations

Notes

References

External links

 

Living people
ABS-CBN personalities
Star Magic personalities
VJs (media personalities)
Filipino male film actors
Filipino Latter Day Saints
1999 births